This is a list of  auto parts, mostly for vehicles using internal combustion engines which are manufactured components of automobiles:

Car body and main parts

Body components, including trim

Doors

Windows

Low voltage/auxiliary electrical system and electronics

Audio/video devices

Cameras

Low voltage electrical supply system

Gauges and meters

Ignition system

Lighting and signaling system

Sensors

Starting system

Electrical switches

Wiring harnesses

Miscellaneous

Interior

Floor components and parts 
Carpet and rubber and other floor material 
Center console (front and rear)

Other components 
Trap (secret compartment)
Roll cage or Exo cage
Dash Panels

Car seat
Arm Rest
Bench seat
Bucket seat
 Children and baby car seat
Fastener
Headrest
Seat belt
 Seat bracket
 Seat cover
 Seat track
 Other seat components
Back seat
Front seat

Power-train and chassis

Braking system

Electrified powertrain components

Engine components and parts

Engine cooling system

Engine oil systems

Exhaust system

Fuel supply system

Suspension and steering systems

Transmission system

Miscellaneous auto parts

Air conditioning system (A/C) 
 Automobile air conditioning
 A/C Clutch
 A/C Compressor
 A/C Condenser
 A/C Hose high pressure
 A/C Kit
 A/C Relay
 A/C Valve
 A/C Expansion Valve
 A/C Low-pressure Valve
 A/C Schroeder Valve
 A/C INNER PLATE
 A/C Cooler
 A/C Evaporator
 A/C Suction Hose Pipe
 A/C Discharge Hose Pipe
 A/C Gas Receiver
 A/C Condenser Filter
 A/C Cabin Filter

Bearings
 Grooved ball bearing
 Needle bearing
 Roller bearing
 Sleeve bearing
 Wheel bearing

Hose 
 Fuel vapour hose
 Reinforced hose (high-pressure hose)
 Non-reinforced hose
 Radiator hose

Other miscellaneous parts 
Logo
 Adhesive tape and foil
 Air bag
 Bolt cap
 License plate bracket
 Cables
 Speedometer cable
 Cotter pin
 Dashboard
 Center console
 Glove compartment
 Drag link
 Dynamic seal
 Fastener
 Gasket: Flat, moulded, profiled
 Hood and trunk release cable
 Horn and trumpet horn
 Injection-molded parts
 Instrument cluster
 Label
 Mirror
 Phone Mount
 Name plate
 Nut
 Flange nut
 Hex nut
 O-ring
 Paint
 Rivet
 Rubber (extruded and molded)
 Screw
 Shim
 Sun visor
 Washer

See also 
 42-volt electrical system
 Fuel economy in automobiles
 Spare parts management
 Electric Car

References

 
Parts
Auto